Flow is a studio album by American jazz trumpeter Terence Blanchard, released on June 7, 2005 by Blue Note Records. The album was nominated for a "Best Jazz Instrumental Album" Grammy Award in 2005.

Background
This disc is imbued with a dark-hued melancholy that really comes to the fore on a pair of elegant, shape-shifting ballads—"Benny's Tune", featuring Hancock on piano, and "Over There".

Reception
Mike Joyce of The Washington Post stated "Flow, Blanchard's new CD, is proof that those salutary effects haven't worn off despite some personnel changes. A worthy follow-up to the ensemble's previous release, Bounce, Flow is more multifaceted than its title suggests, embracing modal harmonic forms as well as flat-out swing, southern soul grooves and West African beats, acoustic textures and synth-triggered shadings. The title cut, though, serves as the album's spine. Divided into three parts and punctuated by other performances, it finds the ensemble pared to a quartet, exploring everything from clattering blues to brassy exultations and Crescent City funk. JazzTimes review by Nate Chinen observed, "Blanchard has crafted a stirring and soulful contemporary outing and one of the strongest albums of his distinguished career. Flow is, start to finish, an ensemble effort. Each of Blanchard’s musicians plays a critical role in the group’s expansive sound, and each contributes a song or two."

Vincent Thomas of Allmusic wrote "...Flow exhibits that no one better balances traditionalism, provincialism and contemporary aesthetics like Blanchard. This is almost immediately evident and highlighted on "Wadagbe," the album's third cut. Blachard's instantly recognizable, clarion-call horn-tone is still there, as is the native New Orleanian's homage to the Nola stomp and mardi gras Indian chants, plus a classically lyrical jazz-head and an end-song coda that singes. Guitarist Lionel Loueke, still in his early 30s at the time, wrote "Wadagbe" and Benny Golson tribute "Benny's Tune." Young drummer Kendrick Scott wrote album-standout "The Source." In fact, Blanchard handles sole writing duties of just one song on the album, "Wandering Wonder," allowing his younger sidemen's voices to shine. It is this young energy that keeps Blanchard and the album's producer, Herbie Hancock, sounding so vibrant and current. Hancock, years into receiving Social Security, turned in the piano solo of the year on "The Source"—a percussive display so cerebral, violent and dramatic that it almost defies belief. Few of Blanchard's Young Lion peers from the 1980s are still relevant in any fresh way, which makes Flow, together with its predecessor Bounce, such a revelation. Blanchard isn't stuck making 60s tribute albums or recycling the sound of his youth. Instead, he's hooking up with the hip kids, sometimes directing traffic, sometimes going with the Flow."

Track listing

Personnel
For four days in mid-December 2004, the trumpeter worked with his sextet at the Jim Henson Studios in Hollywood, California. Tracking the sessions at Henson was engineer Don Murray, who has a relationship with Blanchard dating back to 1995, when the trumpeter scored Kasi Lemmons' film Eve's Bayou.

 Terence Blanchard – trumpet
 Aaron Parks – keyboards
 Brice Winston – tenor and soprano saxophones
 Derrick Hodge – bass
 Lionel Loueke – guitar, vocals
 Kendrick Scott – drums
 Herbie Hancock – piano on "Benny's Tune", "The Source"
 Gretchen Parlato – vocals on "Over There", "Child's Play"

Chart performance

References

Notes
 Terence Blanchard - Flow
 Best of New Orleans: Going With the Flow

Terence Blanchard albums
2005 albums
Blue Note Records albums